Santa Florentina (La Rioja) is a municipality and village within the Chilecito Department of La Rioja Province in northwestern Argentina.

References

Populated places in La Rioja Province, Argentina